Catocala maestosa, commonly known as the sad underwing, is a species of moth in the family Erebidae. The species was first described by George Duryea Hulst in 1884. It is found in the United States from New York south to Florida and Alabama, west to Texas and eastern Oklahoma and north to Illinois, Indiana and Minnesota.

The wingspan is 78–98 mm. Adults are on wing from July to October depending on the location. There is probably one generation per year.

The larvae feed on Carya aquatica, Carya illinoinensis and Juglans nigra.

References

External links
Species info

Moths described in 1884
maestosa
Moths of North America